Little Rock Township occupies the  square (with the southeast corner nipped off by the Fox River) in Kendall County, Illinois. As of the 2010 census, its population was 13,076 and it contained 4,723 housing units. Little Rock is named after Little Rock Creek, which flows through the township.  The largest settlement in the township is the city of Plano, from where the township is administered.

Geography

U.S. Route 34 runs east to west through the township.

Cities and towns
 Plano (majority)
 Sandwich (eastern edge)

Unincorporated towns
 Little Rock

Demographics

Government
The township is governed by an elected Town Board of a Supervisor and four Trustees.  The Township also has an elected Assessor, Clerk, and Highway Commissioner.

Notes

References
 

1849 establishments in Illinois
Townships in Kendall County, Illinois
Townships in Illinois